Heijermans is a surname. Notable people with this surname include:

 Marie Heijermans (1859-1937), Dutch painter
 Herman Heijermans (1864–1924), Dutch writer
 Hubertine Heijermans (born 1936), Dutch visual artist

Dutch-language surnames